Righter is a surname. Notable people with the surname include:

Carroll Righter (1900–1988), American astrologer
Dale Righter (born 1966), American politician
Erwin Righter (1897–1985), American rugby union footballer
Walter C. Righter (born 1923), Episcopal bishop in the United States